Mimosa caesalpiniifolia, known as sabiá in Brazil, is a species of tree with white flowers, a legume in the family Fabaceae. This species is found only in Brazil.

caesalpiniifolia
Taxonomy articles created by Polbot
Taxobox binomials not recognized by IUCN